Denis Sanders (January 21, 1929 – December 10, 1987) was an American film director, screenwriter and producer who directed the debut performances of Robert Redford and Tom Skerritt in the 1962 film War Hunt. He won two Academy Awards, the first for Best Short Subject in 1955 for A Time Out of War that had served as his master's degree thesis at UCLA and which he co-scripted with his brother Terry Sanders; and the second for Best Documentary in 1970 for Czechoslovakia 1968. In 1958, he teamed up again with Terry Sanders to adapt Norman Mailer's World War II novel The Naked and the Dead.

He was born in New York City and died from a heart attack in San Diego, California, where he was professor and film maker in residence at San Diego State University. His daughter, Victoria Sanders, is a literary agent and film producer.

Selected filmography
 A Time Out of War (1954) (with Terry Sanders)
 The Naked and the Dead (1958, screen adaptation)
 Crime and Punishment U.S.A. (1959)
 War Hunt (1962)
 Shock Treatment (1964)
 One Man's Way (1964)
 Czechoslovakia 1968 (1969) (with Robert M. Fresco)
 Elvis: That's the Way It Is (1970)
 Trial – The City and County of Denver vs. Lauren S. Watson (1971)
 Soul to Soul (1971)
 Invasion of the Bee Girls (1973)

References

External links

1929 births
1987 deaths
American male screenwriters
Film producers from California
Film directors from New York City
Film producers from New York (state)
San Diego State University faculty
20th-century American businesspeople
Screenwriters from California
Screenwriters from New York (state)
20th-century American male writers
20th-century American screenwriters
UCLA Film School alumni